UoP Racing Team is the first and longest running Greek Formula Student team located in University of Patras. Founded in 2002 and supported throughout the years by the Laboratory for Manufacturing Systems & Automation, UoP Racing team members design, develop and manufacture high-performance racecars that compete in the Formula Student series around the globe, alongside hundreds of teams from all over the world.

The team's ethos

Background and origins
The idea was born in 2000 when a few students from the Mechanical Engineering & Aeronautics department of the University of Patras decided to build a single-seater racecar and participate in the worldwide competitions of Formula Student. At that time their experience came only from books and their resources were limited. However, under the support of the Laboratory for Manufacturing Systems & Automation, as well as the guidance of professor George Chryssolouris, they managed to gather a team and build their first -of many- single-seater formula style racecar.

Philosophy and education
The main goal of the team is education and working in the team gives students a great opportunity to gain a lot of experience and qualifications. The students that participate in the team are mainly students from the Mechanical Engineering and Aeronautics department of the University of Patras. However, since 2013 the team includes students from other departments, such as Electrical Engineering, Computer Science, Economics and Business Administration. The members are divided in several modules/sub-teams, with each module having one leader who coordinates all members.

Since 2014 the team operates under a new philosophy of resource efficiency. Design and materials are assessed in order to be not only environmentally friendly but also to have the best price to performance ratio. This led to the adoption of an “out of the box” thinking and often the creation of highly innovative ideas, using non-conventional approaches in areas with established technologies and making use of novel manufacturing approaches, which contributes in developing excellent critical thinkers and future engineers. This mentality perfectly captures the spirit of the FSAE/FS competitions.

History
UoP Racing team has been competing officially from 2002 in the aforementioned competitions, and has already built its own history, designing and manufacturing 5 single-seater racecars until today. Highlights include an overall Class 1 win (FS Czech 2014) and winning two times in Class 2 (FS 2003 and 2006), gaining the first position in all events, as well as the special design prize provided by the Institution of Mechanical Engineers (IMechE). In addition, UoP Racing is one of the few Formula Student teams that has won the 1st place in a particular event (Cost & Manufacturing) in back to back competitions (Formula SAE Italy 2016 and Formula Student Czech Republic 2016).

UoP1 (Year: 2002-2004) 

As stated before, 2002 was the starting point of UoP Racing and subsequently the Formula Student programme in Greek universities. Seven students of the department of Mechanical Engineering and Aeronautics at the University of Patras had the idea to build a racecar and take part in Formula Student competitions. 
The concept was then completely unknown in Greece, and the resources available were really limited. UoP1 was way ahead of its time, featuring an (in-house built) hybrid composite monocoque chassis, with a removable subframe, 10” wheels to minimize unsprung mass and inertia, and a 4-cylinder Yamaha engine. 
The team went on to win the IMechE Design award and conquered the first place in the overall scoreboard of the Class 2 in FSUK (the only European competition back in the day, held in Bruntingthorpe Proving Ground) in 2003 and was the first ever Greek entry in Class 1 in 2004. Reliability issues prevented the team to score high, but the experience gained from the competitions was of utmost importance for the evolution and future potential of the team. 
Since 2014, UoP1 has found a new home in the Hellenic Motor Museum as part of the permanent exhibition "Made by Hellas", to serve as a reminder of how it all began.

UoP2 (Year: 2005-2007) 
Aiming for the continuation of the project in the University of Patras, a brand new team of nine students participated in the 2005 FS Competition for the first time, as a Class 3 entry, presenting a new design solution for the next FS car to be manufactured. Simpler, cheaper and more straightforward solutions were adopted throughout the development of the car, using a steel tubular spaceframe and directly actuated dampers. UoP2 also marked the beginning of the single cylinder engine era for the team. All of the changes led to a more advanced and lighter car than UoP1.

UoP2Evo (Year: 2008-2009)
UoP2Evo is an almost complete upgrade of the UoP2. Using the same basic components, the chassis was redesigned to improve stiffness. At the same time, changes to almost all subsystems led to a further reduction of its total weight. Track was increased for stability, while dampers actuation was changed to pushrod. Moreover, a completely new, lighter and higher quality bodywork was built. The car participated successfully in all the events of the competitions UoP Racing took part in, which again helped the team gain valuable experience for development of future cars.

UoP3 (Year: 2009-2010) 
An alternative way of manufacturing came up during the designing process of UoP3. The changes applied would bring a major innovation in team's history. A new frame was constructed from carbon fiber monocoque which became a key ingredient for UoP racing. The car being lightweight was a top priority and that led to a change in the engine used, as the team switched from a Yamaha XT600E (3AJ) to a Yamaha WR450. The third generation of the team, which consisted of 12 students, gathered all the feedback and experience from the design and construction of the two previous cars and aimed high. The racecar competed only in the FSAE Michigan competition of that year and proved significantly lighter than its predecessors. As of November 2016, UoP3 remains the lightest racecar of UoP Racing, weighing 175 kilos.

UoP3Evo (Year: 2011-2012) 
After receiving encouraging feedback from judges in previous years' competitions, the 18 members of the team improved the UoP3 chassis construction, while redesigning the suspension system to reduce compliances. The powertrain sub-system was retained, albeit with a revised differential mount and exhaust system. The result was a slightly heavier car but way more reliable. UoP3Evo successfully participated in Formula Student Germany held in Hockenheimring and in Formula SAE Italy held in Autodromo Riccardo Paletti, finishing in all dynamic events that year, rendering the best results the team had this far.

UoP4e (Year: 2012-2014) 
After 10 years of participating in Formula Student competitions and a lot of research in the evolution of motorsport, the team took the major and difficult decision to leave internal combustion engines, which marked the beginning of the “electric car era” for the team. Trying to keep up with the trend of the future, but also the spirit of Formula Student competition that promotes innovation, the team's 4th racecar is not only the team's first electric-powered racecar, but also the first Formula Student type racecar with an electric motor manufactured in Greece. 
UoP4e incorporates all knowledge and experience from the three previous UoP Formula Student racecars, namely a carbon fiber monocoque chassis and 10” wheels. The car's highlight is probably the drivetrain/powertrain sub-system. In regards to the transmission, electric motor and accumulator, the team had these three words on their mind during the car's development phase: Functionality - Durability - Lightweight. 
UoP4e has a more complex geometry than the previous cars, but its ergonomically focused design and increased stiffness give confidence for the construction of a high performance car. A single electric motor, directly driving a differential without the use of a gearbox was promoted for its simplicity, reliability, and ease-of-maintenance. 
In 2013, UoP4e received an aerodynamics package, something the team had never experimented with up until then. The benefit of a well-developed aerodynamic package was evident early in the development process. 
In the end, the car turned out to be an amazing performer, being by far the fastest and most successful car of the team so far, finishing in 5th place overall in Formula Student UK electric class and winning the Formula Student Czech Republic competition, setting high targets for the years to come!

UoP5e (Year:2015-2016)

The team's fifth racecar marked yet a new chapter in the team's approach to the development of an FS racecar. With the same mentality as the one assumed during the UoP4e's development cycle, the team focused on simple, yet creative and unique concepts throughout the car, making UoP5e the team's most unique racecar to date. Featuring a chassis made entirely out of honeycomb aluminum panels, a unique choice among other FS teams, better driver ergonomics and impressive efficiency, while still displaying high performance on the track, the UoP5e is the result of hard work and the mentality of a pioneer. The lightweight but durable frame, along with the advanced and innovative aerodynamic package make the UoP5e not only a joy to drive, but also a joy to watch going around the track. Powered by a fully electric powertrain combined with a custom made gearbox to optimize motor torque delivery, while the use of the aforementioned cut & fold monocoque chassis offers a sustainable yet durable and stiff structure, optimized to safely accommodate a wide range of drivers and also contributing in keeping Power/Weight ratio high. All the above characteristics make UoP5e a lean and agile racecar and at the same time make clear that electric racecars are meant to be fast, reliable and a strong competitor against I.C.E. cars. Even though the creation of UoP5e was a challenging process, the car was competitive during the dynamic events of FSAE Italy 2016 and FS Czech Republic 2016. In addition, the resource efficient design and manufacturing helped the team secure the 1st place in the Cost & Manufacturing static event in both aforementioned competitions, an achievement only a few Formula Student teams have accomplished.

UoP5Evo (Year:2016-2017) 

UoP5evo was an upgrade on almost every aspect in comparison to the UoP5e. The chassis was constructed using the cut and fold technique, with honeycomb aluminum panels. The results were superior mechanical properties and better weight to stiffness ratio. Furthermore, even more improved ergonomics were achieved, while also a higher safety of the driver. In terms of aero, it was redesigned from scratch. The front wing was made shorter, and the back wing consisted of two instead of four elements. Moreover, the undertray was chosen to be more aggressive and efficient. Finally, the side foils were abandoned for a nose cone foil able to balance the front and rear wings. At last the electronics were completely redesigned too. The use of lower capacity batteries was managed by opting for higher voltage. In addition, we used the CAN-bus notes leading to simplified wiring. The lower capacity batteries and the unified wiring harness led to a decrease in the overall weight of our car. The UoP5evo carried on the success of its predecessor by securing the 1st place in the Efficiency Dynamic Event and the 3rd place in the Cost Event and the 1st place among the electric racecars, during the FSUK 2017 competition, in addition to being competitive during the FSG 2017 competition.

UoP6e (Year:2017-2018) 
UoP6e was based on the competitive UoP5evo. The chassis was constructed using the same materials as UoP5evo but with more efficient techniques in order to make the process faster and achieving a higher quality at the finished product. Furthermore, changes were done at the back of the chassis in order to simplify the geometry and thus achieve better internal packaging. In terms of aero, the philosophy with a nosecone airfoil was kept while introducing a more an effective diffuser which works better  with the new bigger (due to the increase of the rear track) rear wing  into which DRS was introduced. Regarding the drivetrain, the same motor EMRAX 228 was used and the same two stages gearbox as UoP5evo. At last, at the electronics lower capacity batteries was managed by opting for higher voltage. In addition, the use of CAN-bus notes was maintained for a simplified wiring. The UoP6e participated in the Formula Student Germany 2018 Competition and conquered the 21st place among the most competitive contestants of the world.

Participations and awards

References

Formula SAE
Motorsport in Greece
University of Patras
2002 establishments in Greece